The 38th Academy of Country Music Awards were held on May 21, 2003 at for the first time was held at the Mandalay Bay Resort & Casino, Las Vegas, Nevada. The ceremony was hosted by ACM Award winner, Reba McEntire.

Winners and nominees 
Winners are shown in bold.

References 

Academy of Country Music Awards
Academy of Country Music Awards
Academy of Country Music Awards
Academy of Country Music Awards
Academy of Country Music Awards
Academy of Country Music Awards